This is a list of diplomatic missions in Guinea-Bissau.  At present, the capital city of Bissau hosts 20 embassies. As the Government of Guinea-Bissau does not maintain an official website nor an electronic version of its diplomatic list, most of the information on this page has been obtained from the websites of the countries' respective foreign ministries and thus must be considered incomplete pending the availability of an official list.

Diplomatic missions in Bissau

Embassies

Other missions or delegations 
 (Delegation)
 (Liaison office)
 (Liaison office)

Gallery

Non-resident embassies accredited to Guinea-Bissau 

Resident in Abuja, Nigeria:

Resident in Conakry, Guinea:

  

 
 

Resident in Dakar, Senegal

  

 

  

Resident in Lisbon, Portugal:

Resident in Rabat, Morocco

 

Resident in other cities:

 (Paris)
 (Accra)
 (Paris)
 (London)
 (Algiers)
 (Nouakchott)

Former embassies 

 (closed in 1999)

See also 
 Foreign relations of Guinea-Bissau
 List of diplomatic missions of Guinea-Bissau

Notes

References

External links
 US Background Notes: Guinea-Bissau (For the resident embassies)

Guinea-Bissau
Diplomatic missions